Oh, Father may refer to:

TV
Oh, Father!, see Oh, Brother! (TV series)
Oh! Father (film) (オー!ファーザー Ō! Fāzā), 2013 Japanese film based on the novel Oh! Father (オー!ファーザー Ō! Fāzā) by Kotaro Isaka 2010

Music

Albums
Oh, Father!, 1956 jazz album by Earl Hines
Oh, Father, 1994 album by Baha Men

Songs
"Oh Father", 1989 song by Madonna
Oh, Father, 1994 song by Baha Men, theme song from film My Father, The Hero
Oh Father, 2006 song by Linda Sundblad, No.1 in Sweden
Oh, Father, 2010 song by Street Dogs from Street Dogs (album)